H&Q Asia Pacific (H&QAP) is an Asian private equity firm founded in 1986 by Ta-lin Hsu as a branch of the investment bank Hambrecht & Quist. It is one of the oldest and most established private equity firms in the Asia-Pacific region. It has offices located in Silicon Valley, Shanghai, Hong Kong, Taipei, Tokyo, Seoul, Manila, and Singapore.

It was founded by Dr. Ta-lin Hsu as a division of U.S. investment banking firm Hambrecht & Quist. H&QAP is now an independent organization that conducts later-stage control investments and earlier-stage venture capital investments. It focuses on growth sectors including technology, technology manufacturing, consumer brands and financial services.

In 2006, Ta-lin Hsu was ranked on the Forbes magazine Midas List of Top 25 best dealmakers in high-tech and life sciences.

In September 2015, the firm invested in and launched its Global Innovation Center (GIC) for $100-million.

Investments
 Starbucks Beijing - China
 Semiconductor Manufacturing International Corporation (SMIC) - China
 Gonzo Digimation Holding Company - Japan
 MTV Japan - Japan
 Array Networks - Silicon Valley
 Taiwan Semiconductor Manufacturing Corporation (TSMC) - Taiwan
 KSNET - Korea
 Jobkorea.com- Korea

References

External links
Company Homepage

Private equity firms of Asia-Pacific
Financial services companies established in 1986
Investment banking private equity groups
Private equity firms of Hong Kong